Cheewhat Giant, also known as the Cheewhat Lake Cedar, is a large western red cedar (Thuja plicata) tree located within Pacific Rim National Park Reserve on Vancouver Island in British Columbia, Canada. It is the largest living Western redcedar, the largest known tree in Canada and one of the largest in the world.

History
The tree was discovered in 1988 within the already established Pacific Rim National Park Reserve. It was named after nearby Cheewhat Lake. With the death of the  Quinault Lake Cedar in 2016, the Cheewhat Lake tree became the world's largest living Western redcedar.

See also
 Red Creek Fir - largest Douglas-fir in the world, also located on Vancouver Island
 Duncan Cedar - largest Western redcedar in the United States, located on the Olympic Peninsula
 List of individual trees
 List of superlative trees

References

Individual trees in British Columbia
Individual western redcedar trees